Fiji competed at the 2019 Pacific Games in Apia, Samoa from 7 to 20 July 2019. The country participated in 24 sports at the 2019 games. Team Fiji will not be represented in volleyball or beach volleyball.

Archery

Athletics

Men's athletics
Track and road events

Field events

Combined events – Decathlon

Women's athletics

Track and road events

Field events

Combined events – Heptathlon

Badminton

Fiji qualified five players in Badminton for the 2019 games.

Men
 Burty Molia

Women
 Karyn Gibson
 Andra Whiteside
 Danielle Whiteside
 Ashley Yee

Basketball

5x5

Men's basketball
 TBC

Women's basketball
 TBC

3x3 basketball

Fiji selected eight players (four male and four female) to compete in 3x3 at the 2019 games:

Men
 Henry Tabuduka
 Filimone Waqabaca
 Joshua Motufaga
 Marques Whippy

Women
 Mickaelar Mendez
 Bulou Koyamainavure
 Letava Whippy
 Vilisi Tavui

Boxing

Cricket

Football

Men's football

Squad
Head coach:  Christophe Gamel

Women's football

Squad
TBC

Golf

Fiji qualified eight players for the 2019 tournament:

Men
 Abid Hussain
 Asish Chand
 Baarroon Hussain
 Olaf Allen

Women
 Dawi Jee
 Emi Subam
 Merelita McCarthy
 Raina Kumar

Judo

Lawn bowls

Netball

Outrigger canoeing

V6 500m men ( Sliver Medalist )
 Tomasi Andrea
 Apisai Kalou
 Willie Naiqasima
 Andrew Peters
 Johji Wong
 Clayton Horsefall

V6 marathon ( Bronze Medalist )
 Tomasi Andrea
 John Semisi
 Andrew Peters
 Willie Naiqasima
 Johji Wong
 Clayton Horsefall

Powerlifting

Rugby league nines

Men's rugby league
 TBC

Women's rugby league
 TBC

Rugby sevens

Men's sevens

Women's sevens

Sailing

Shooting

Squash

Swimming

Fiji Swimming announced eleven swimmers had qualified for the 2019 games:

Men
 Herbert Rabua
 Taichi Vakasama
 Netani Ross
 Temafa Yalimaiwai
 Hansel Makei
 Hefu Erasito
 Jeremiah Faktoufon

Women
 Moana Wines
 Matelita Baudromo
 Rosemary Rova
 Maryanne Kotobalavu

Table tennis

Taekwondo

The Fiji Taekwondo Association announced a team of seven (with a further spot yet to be filled) for the 2019 games:

Men
 Sakiusa Tuva
 Pranit Kumar
 Josefa Otterbech
 Apisai Baleloa
 Kitione Mua

Women
 Anegha Narayan
 Mikari Tekairaba

Tennis

Touch rugby

Triathlon

Weightlifting

References

Nations at the 2019 Pacific Games
2019